Performing Frogs is a 1982 sculpture by David Gilhooly, located in Eugene, Oregon, in the United States.

Description
David Gilhooly's Performing Frogs (1982) is a ceramic sculpture depicting frogs performing acrobatics atop six concrete pillars; some of them have birds sitting on their heads. It is installed at the Hult Center for the Performing Arts. A nearby plaque reads: . The sculpture's condition was deemed "treatment urgent" by the Smithsonian Institution's "Save Outdoor Sculpture!" program in October 1993. It was administered by the City of Eugene then.

See also
 1982 in art
 Frogs in popular culture

References

1982 establishments in Oregon
1982 sculptures
Animal sculptures in Oregon
Sculptures of birds in Oregon
Ceramic sculptures in the United States
Concrete sculptures in Oregon
Frogs in art
Statues in Eugene, Oregon